California's 39th congressional district is a congressional district in the U.S. state of California.
The district includes parts of Riverside County, including Jurupa Valley, Riverside, Moreno Valley, and Perris. The district has been represented by Democrat Mark Takano ever since he was redistricted from the 41st congressional district in 2022.

In statewide races

Composition

As of the 2020 redistricting, California's 39th congressional district was geographically shifted to the Inland Empire in Southern California. It is within the western region of Riverside County.

Riverside County is split between this district and the 41st district. They are partitioned by the Corona Freeway, River Trails Park, Redley Substation Rd, Arlington Ave, Alhambra Ave, Golden Ave, Doheny Blvd, Bolivar St, Campbell Ave, Pierce St, Quantico Dr, Collett Ave, Buchanan St, Highway 91, 12397 Doherty Way-Magnolia Ave, BNSF Railroad, N McKinley St, N Temescal St, E 16th St, S Neece St, Indiana Ave, Skyridge Dr, Fillmore St, 2969 Fillmore St-La Sierra Ave, Cleveland Ave, McAllister Parkway, Corsica Ave, Hermosa Dr, John F. Kennedy Dr, Wood Rd, Colt St, Dauchy Ave, Van Buren Blvd, Bobbit Ave, Chicago Ave, Krameria Ave, 16510 Sendero del Charro-Mariposa Ave, Barton St, Cole Ave, Rider St, Greenwood Ave, Kabian Park, Goetz Park, Ethanac Rd, McLaughlin Rd, Sherman Rd, Tumble Rd, Watson Rd, Escondido Expressway, Mapes Rd, Ellis Ave, Antelope Rd, Rico Ave, San Jacinto River, Ramona Expressway, Lake Perris State Recreation Area, Gilman Springs Rd, Moreno Valley Freeway, Quincy St, Cloud Haven Dr, Holly Ct, Reche Vista Dr, Reche Canyon Rd, and Keissel Rd. The 39th district takes in the cities of Moreno Valley, Jurupa Valley, Perris, and Riverside, as well as the census-designated places Mead Valley.

Cities & CDP with 10,000 or more people
 Riverside - 314,998
 Moreno Valley - 208,634
 Jurupa Valley - 105,053
 Perris - 78,700
 Mead Valley - 20,817

List of members representing the district

Election results

1972

1974

1976

1978

1980

1982

1984

1986

1988

1990

1992

1994

1996

1998

2000

2002

2004

2006

2008

2010

2012

2014

2016

2018

In January 2018, Republican incumbent Ed Royce announced his retirement. Royce's retirement created great uncertainty and interest in this election, due to the possibility of two candidates of the same political party winning California's jungle primary.

The primary election resulted in two candidates of different parties, with Republican Assemblywoman Young Kim and Democrat Gil Cisneros coming in first and second place respectively. After the general election, it took several days to gather and tally absentee ballots, but on November 17, Cisneros was the projected winner of the election.

2020

2022

Historical district boundaries
The 39th congressional district was originally one of five reapportioned to California after the 1970 United States census.

From 1993 to 2003, the 39th congressional district was a Republican stronghold. In 2003, this territory was mostly redesignated into the neighboring 40th congressional district and 42nd congressional district. From 2003 to 2013, the 39th district was represented by Linda Sánchez, who now represents the 38th congressional district.

See also
List of United States congressional districts

References

External links
GovTrack.us: California's 39th congressional district
RAND California Election Returns: District Definitions
California Voter Foundation map - CD39

39
Government of Los Angeles County, California
Government in Orange County, California
Government of San Bernardino County, California
Government of Fullerton, California
Anaheim, California
Brea, California
Buena Park, California
Chino Hills (California)
Chino Hills, California
Diamond Bar, California
Hacienda Heights, California
La Habra, California
Placentia, California
Walnut, California
Yorba Linda, California
Constituencies established in 1973
1973 establishments in California